Paisa Yaar N Panga (पैसा यार और पंगा, ਪੈਸਾ ਯਾਰ ਪੰਗਾ) is a Punjabi comedy film directed by Virender Singh and produced by Bharat Arora, Arvinder Singh, Gurprit Singh Gujral, Starring Gavie Chahal, Mukul Dev, Khushboo Grewal, Flora Saini, Karan Sekhon (Debut), Veer Vashisht. Movie is produced under banner Blockbuster Motion Pictures. The film revolving around 3 best buddies, but the thriller comes when Mukul Dev enters in their lives. Paisa Yaar N Panga was released on 1 August 2014.

Cast
 Gavie Chahal as Fateh
 Mukul Dev as Ranveer Walia
 Veer Vashisht as Karan
 Khushboo Grewal as Vaani
 Flora Saini as Meera
 Karan Sekhon as Bunty
 Rishita Monga as Reet
 Ranjeev Verma as SSP
 Richa as Dolly

Release
The film was initially scheduled to release on 11 July 2014.

References

External links
 

2014 films
Punjabi-language Indian films
2010s Punjabi-language films
Films scored by Jassi Katyal
Films scored by Gurmeet Singh